War of the Planets is a film title which may refer to:

War of the Planets (1966) (original title: I Diafanoidi Vengono da Marte), an Italian science fiction film from 1966, directed by Antonio Margheriti
War of the Planets (1977) (original title: Anno zero - Guerra nello spazio), an Italian science fiction film from 1977, directed by Alfonso Brescia